Drews is a surname. Notable people with the surname include:

 Arthur Drews (1863-1935), German writer, historian and philosopher
 Annie Drews (born 1993), American Olympic gold medalist in volleyball
 Berta Drews (1901-1987), German film actress
 Bill Drews (1870-1938), German lawyer and Prussian Minister of the Interior
 Carl Drews (1894–1983), German cinematographer
 Dani Drews (born 1999), American volleyball player
 Egon Drews (1926–2011), West German flatwater canoer
 Frank Drews (1916-1972), American Major League Baseball player
 Günter Drews (born 1967), German retired footballer
 Jürgen Drews (born 1945), German Schlager singer, musician, songwriter, actor and restaurateur
 Karl Drews (1920–1963), American Major League Baseball pitcher
 Lofty Drews (born 1940), Kenyan former rally co-driver
 Paul Drews (1858-1912), German Lutheran theologian
 Robert Drews (born 1936), American historian
 Stefan Drews (born 1979), German decathlete
 Stipe Drews (born Stipe Drviš in 1973), Croatian retired boxer

See also 
 Drews Gap, Oregon, United States
 Drew (name)